Colobothea subcincta is a species of beetle in the family Cerambycidae. It was described by Laporte in 1840. It is known from Brazil.

References

subcincta
Beetles described in 1840